is a Japanese phrase, used when ordering food in restaurants, that means 'I'll leave it up to you' (from Japanese ).

Usage 
The phrase omakase, literally 'I leave it up to you', is most commonly used when dining at Japanese restaurants where the customer leaves it up to the chef to select and serve seasonal specialties. The Japanese antonym for omakase is okonomi, which means choosing what to order. In American English, the expression is used by patrons at sushi restaurants to leave the selection to the chef, as opposed to ordering à la carte. The chef will present a series of plates, beginning with the lightest fare and proceeding to the heaviest dishes. The phrase is not exclusive to raw fish with rice and can incorporate grilling, simmering and other cooking techniques.

Characteristics 

The Michelin Guide said "few formal dining experiences are as revered or as intimidating" as omakase.

Customers ordering omakase style expect the chef to be innovative and surprising in selecting dishes, and the meal can be likened to an artistic performance. Some people may think that ordering omakase can be a gamble, however the customer typically receives the highest-quality fish available at a lower cost than if it had been ordered à la carte. According to Jeffrey Steingarten, recounting in Vogue a 22-course "memorable feast" that required several hours:

 Food writer Joanne Drilling compared the omakase experience to prix fixe but said it was "slightly different. It involves completely ceding control of the ordering process and letting the chef choose your dinner." Like Steingarten she recommends omakase dining at the sushi counter. The Michelin guide called omakase the "spiritual companion and counterpoint to kaiseki", an elaborate multi-course highly ritualized meal.

See also 

 List of restaurant terminology
 Okonomiyaki

Notes

References 
 
 

Sushi
Japanese words and phrases
Restaurant terminology
Japanese cuisine
Japanese cuisine terms